The 2000 California Golden Bears football team was an American football team that represented the University of California, Berkeley in the Pacific-10 Conference (Pac-10) during the 2000 NCAA Division I-A football season. In their fourth year under head coach Tom Holmoe, the Golden Bears compiled a 3–8 record (2–6 against Pac-10 opponents), finished in last place in the Pac-10, and were outscored by their opponents by a combined score of 295 to 246.

The team's statistical leaders included Kyle Boller with 2,121 passing yards, Joe Igber with 901 rushing yards, and Geoff McArthur with 336 receiving yards.

Schedule

References

California
California Golden Bears football seasons
California Golden Bears football